Marie-Laure Rosene Lambert (1935, Geneva, Switzerland – 12 June 1961) was a female Swiss motorcycle racer.

Lambert competed as a female passenger to her husband, sidecar driver Claude Lambert. At the 1961 Isle of Man TT races their BMW sidecar outfit crashed at Gob-ny-Geay (35th mile marker) before Brandish Corner, and Lambert died from her injuries.

Sources

External links
 TT database rider profile iomtt.com
 TT database TT results iomtt.com

1935 births
1961 deaths
Swiss sportswomen
Swiss motorcycle racers
Isle of Man TT riders
Motorcycle racers who died while racing
Sport deaths in the Isle of Man
Female motorcycle racers
Sportspeople from Geneva